The cinema of Madagascar refers to the film industry in Madagascar.

The most notable director is Raymond Rajaonarivelo, director of movies such as Quand Les Etoiles Rencontrent La Mer (When the Stars Meet the Sea) and Tabataba (The Spreading of Rumors).

The oldest cinematographic production entirely produced in Madagascar by a Malagasy is a 22-minute black-and-white movie entitled Rasalama Martiora (Rasalama, the Martyr). Directed in 1937 by the deacon Philippe Raberojo, it marked the centenary of the death of the Protestant martyr Rafaravavy Rasalama. Philippe Raberojo was the president of an association of French citizens of Malagasy origin, where he had access to a 9,5mm camera. Thus he was able to realise his film. The complete version is lost.

In the following years there was considerable political upheaval in the country. In 1960 independence was regained in Madagascar, but political instability remains. This complicated post-colonial period led to the closure or transformation of the country's cinemas into places of religious worship.

The film industry started to recover slowly around the year 2006 also due to the founding of Rencontres du Film Court Madagascar, which is the only film festival in the country.

Around 60 short films and 1 or 2 feature films are made each year.  Most Malagasy productions receive no public funding.

In the Malagasy language, the word “cinema” is translated “sarimihetsika” which literally means “moving image”.

Films

References

 
Malagasy films
Malagasy culture